Delavan/Canisius College (formerly Delavan–College until September 1, 2003) is a Buffalo Metro Rail station located at the northeast corner of Main Street and East Delavan Avenue and is known as having one of the longest escalators set up in the country. Delavan/Canisius College station was also bored through rock and remnants of Cold Spring (a small spring) that are visible through occasional water running on the track bed floors.

Bus connections

Delavan/Canisius College station is one of four stations that offers a bus loop, requiring passengers to board/debark using curbside stops (the other three being University, LaSalle and Utica) and one of only two that has a driveway for bus lines that connect with Metro Rail (the other being Utica). Route 8 buses heading toward Marine Drive or University station and route 26 buses heading toward Thruway Mall do not board at the curb on the same side as the station, which is served by four bus routes:

Boarding from Bus Loop:
 18 Jefferson (inbound)
 29 Wohlers (inbound)
Boarding on Main Street:
 8 Main
Boarding on East Delavan Avenue:
 26 Delavan

Artwork
In 1979, an art selection committee was created, composed of NFTA commissioners and Buffalo area art experts, that would judge the artwork that would be displayed in and on the properties of eight stations on the Metro Rail line. Out of the 70 proposals submitted, 22 were chosen and are currently positioned inside and outside of the eight underground stations. Delavan/Canisius College station is home of three pieces of work, from Sam Gilliam (Washington, DC), Carson Waterman (Seneca-Iroquois National Museum) and George Woodman (New York City and Boulder, CO).

Notable places nearby
Delavan/Canisius College station is located near:
 Canisius College
 Cold Spring Bus Garage
 Forest Lawn Cemetery, Buffalo
 Gates Circle
 Hamlin Park Neighborhood

References

Buffalo Metro Rail stations
Railway stations in New York (state) at university and college campuses
Railway stations in the United States opened in 1985
Railway stations located underground in New York (state)
1985 establishments in New York (state)
Canisius College